Nine Deadly Venoms is the debut album by British music producer Jonathan Saul Kane, released in 1994 under his stage name Depth Charge. The album compiles several 12" singles released by Kane under the Depth Charge name in the preceding five years. Kane is often cited as a forerunner of trip hop and an influence on labels such as Mo' Wax and Ninja Tune. The tracks on the album comprise instrumental hip hop beats with dialogue and musical samples from films, particularly martial arts movies, westerns and horror films.

Some sources have claimed that the versions of the tracks included on the CD version of the album are shorter edits, and that the vinyl contains the longer, unedited 12" versions. However, this is not the case. Initial copies of the CD version came with a bonus disc featuring extra tracks from the Hubba Hubba Hubba EP.

Track listing
 "Shaolin Buddha Finger" – 6:47
 "Dead by Dawn" – 5:05
 "Bounty Killer" – 5:24
 "Depth Charge" – 5:47
 "Bastard Swordsman" – 4:39
 "Bounty Killer II" – 3:50
 "Daughters of Darkness" – 5:29
 "Goal" – 3:59
 "Hubba Hubba Hubba (What's in the Bag Man?)" – 4:11

Limited edition bonus disc
 "Hubba Hubba Hubba (Knife in the Bag Version)" – 5:46
 "Number 9" – 5:50
 "The Guide" – 3:41

References

Jonathan Saul Kane albums
1994 debut albums